Wolfgang Haffner (born 7 December 1965) is a German jazz drummer with an extensive discography.

Discography
 2020 - Kind of Tango
 2019 – 4WD (with Nils Landgren)
 2019 – The East End (with Bill Evans)
 2017 – Kind of Spain (with Jan Lundgren, Sebastian Studnitzky, Daniel Stelter, Christopher Dell & Lars Danielsson)
 2015 – Kind of Cool
 2012 – Heart of the Matter (with Dominic Miller, Eythor Gunnarsson, Sebastian Studnitzky)
 2011 – Gravity (with Lars Danielsson, Julian Wasserfuhr & Roman Wasserfuhr)
 2010 – Wolfgang Haffner Edition
 2009 – Round Silence
 2008 – Acoustic Shapes
 2007 – Express (with Metro)
 2006 – Abracadabra: Celebrating Klaus Doldinger (with Roberto di Gioia & Dieter Ilg)
 2006 – Shapes (Produced with  Nils Landgren)
 2004 – ZOOMING
 2004 – Funky Abba (with Nils Landgren)
 2003 – Music For Jazz Orchestra (with Albert Mangelsdorff and the NDR-Big-Band)
 2002 – Live & Real
 2002 – Grapevine (with Metro)
 2002 – When The Angels Swing (with „No Angels“)
 2001 – Urban Life
 2000 – The German Jazz Masters Old Friends
 2000 – Metrocafe (with Metro)
 2000 – Swing Low Sweet Clarinet (with Eddie Daniels and hr-Big-Band)
 1999 – Love (with Till Brönner)
 1999 – Music
 1998 – Zappelbude (with Roberto Di Gioia)
 1998 – Celtic Moon (with Miller Anderson)
 1997 – All the April Snow (with Peter Bolte)
 1997 - Hut Ab! (with Albert Mangelsdorff)
 1997 – Back Home
 1996 – Beautiful Love (with Eddie Daniels)
 1996 – One Kiss (with Carmen Cuesta)
 1995 – Tree People (with Metro)
 1994 – Metro (with Metro)
 1992 – Movin‘ On
 1990 – Balance of Happiness (with Klaus Doldingers Passport)
 1987 – Al Cohn meets Al Porcino (with Al Cohn)

External links

Wolfgang Haffner website - biography, discography, tour dates, news, gallery, etc.
Wolfgang Haffner Interview NAMM Oral History Library (2008)

References

1965 births
Living people
German jazz drummers
Male drummers
German male musicians
ACT Music artists
German male jazz musicians